Şirinköy can refer to:

 Şirinköy, Bartın
 Şirinköy, Biga
 Şirinköy, Gökçeada
 Şirinköy, Zonguldak